Issiar Dia (born 8 June 1987) is a professional footballer who most recently played as a winger for Turkish club Yeni Malatyaspor. Born in France, he represented Senegal at international level.

Club career

Nancy
In summer 2006, Dia joined AS Nancy from SC Amiens for a €2 million transfer fee. On 10 September 2006, he made his Ligue 1 debut in a match against Toulouse FC replacing Monsef Zerka in the 68th minute. 18 days later, he scored on his international debut in a 3–1 return leg win against tournament favourites FC Schalke 04 in the first round of the UEFA Cup; he was involved in all three goals.

In his first spell at AS Nancy, he made a total of 115 league appearances scoring 13 goals with 8 of those coming in his last season at the club.

Fenerbahçe
On 21 July 2010, Fenerbahçe announced that Dia had joined the team on a four-year contract for a sum of €8 million. He ended a long scoring drought on 5 February 2011 with a goal against Manisaspor, as Fenerbahçe won 3–1 in the dying minutes of the game. After a two-year spell with the Turkish club, he joined Qatari champions Lekhwiya SC.

Lekhwiya

Al Kharaitiyat (loan)

Gazélec Ajaccio

Al Kharaitiyat

Nancy
On 31 August 2016, Dia returned to Nancy on a one-year deal. He left the club at the end of the season.

Yeni Malatyaspor 
On 1 July 2017, Dia returned to Turkey and sign three years deal with Yeni Malatyaspor.

International career
Dia earned a call up to the France U-21 squad, the country of his birth.

After his 21st birthday, he chose to pledge his future to the Senegalese. He was selected for the squad the first time possible, against Gambia, and came on as a substitute in the 61st minute for Frederic Mendy.

Career statistics

Club

International
Scores and results list Senegal's goal tally first, score column indicates score after each Dia goal.

Honours
Fenerbahçe
Süper Lig: 2010–11
Turkish Cup: 2011–12

References

External links
 
 France U-21 squad 2006–07 
 Roulf.free.fr profile 
 stats.globesports.com
 fanatik.ekolay.net
 

1987 births
Living people
People from Sèvres
Footballers from Hauts-de-Seine
French sportspeople of Senegalese descent
Citizens of Senegal through descent
French footballers
France under-21 international footballers
France youth international footballers
Senegalese footballers
Senegal international footballers
Senegalese expatriate footballers
Ligue 1 players
Ligue 2 players
Süper Lig players
Qatar Stars League players
AC Boulogne-Billancourt players
INF Clairefontaine players
Amiens SC players
AS Nancy Lorraine players
Fenerbahçe S.K. footballers
Lekhwiya SC players
Al Kharaitiyat SC players
Expatriate footballers in Turkey
Expatriate footballers in Qatar
2012 Africa Cup of Nations players
French expatriate sportspeople in Turkey
Senegalese expatriate sportspeople in Turkey
Association football midfielders